Nepenthes nigra is a tropical pitcher plant known from a number of mountains across Central Sulawesi, where it grows at elevations of 1500–2700 m above sea level. The specific epithet nigra refers to the dark colouration of the pitchers and stem. The species is closely related to N. hamata and N. tentaculata.

Natural hybrids
 N. glabrata × N. nigra
 N. nigra × N. tentaculata

References

 Lee, C.C. 2012. New Pitcher Plant Discoveries. Jungle Notes, February 2, 2012. 

Carnivorous plants of Asia
nigra
Endemic flora of Sulawesi
Plants described in 2011